Geris may refer to
Geriş (disambiguation), name of several Turkish villages
Saint-Gilles-les-Forêts (Occitan: Sent Geris), a commune in France
Harry Geris (1947–2008), Canadian Olympic wrestler